A Thousand Little Kisses (translit. Elef Nishikot K'tanot) is a 1981 Israeli drama film written and directed by Mira Recanati. The film was selected as the Israeli entry for the Best Foreign Language Film at the 54th Academy Awards, but was not accepted as a nominee. It was also screened in the Un Certain Regard section of the 1981 Cannes Film Festival.

Cast
 Dina Doron as Routa
 Kohava Harari
 Adi Kaplan
 Rivka Neuman as Alma
 Rina Otchital as Mara
 Daphne Recanati as Daphna
 Gad Roll as Mika
 Dan Tavori as Uri
 Nirit Yaron as Nili (as Nirit Gronich)
 Nissim Zohar as Eli o

See also
 List of submissions to the 54th Academy Awards for Best Foreign Language Film
 List of Israeli submissions for the Academy Award for Best Foreign Language Film

References

External links
 

1981 films
1981 drama films
Israeli drama films
1980s Hebrew-language films